Blaesodactylus boivini is a species of gecko, a lizard in the family Gekkonidae. The species is endemic to Madagascar.

Etymology
The specific name, boivini, is in honor of French botanist Louis Hyacinthe Boivin.

Geographic range
B. boivini is found in northern Madagascar.

Habitat

Reproduction
B. boivini is oviparous.

References

Further reading
Duméril, Auguste [Henri André] (1856). "Description des Reptiles nouveaux ou imparfaitement connus de la Collection du Muséum d'Histoire naturelle et Remarques sur la Classification et les Caractères des Reptiles. Deuxième Mémoire ... (Geckotiens, Varaniens et Iguaniens) ". Archives du Muséum d'Histoire Naturelle, Paris 8: 437–588. (Platydactylus boivini, new species, pp. 454–455 + Plate XVIII, figures 2, 2a, 2b). (in French).
Glaw F, Vences M (1994). A Field Guide to the Amphibians and Reptiles of Madagascar, Second Edition. Cologne, Germany: Vences & Glaw Verlag / Serpents Tale. 480 pp. .
Kluge AG, Nussbaum RA (1995). "A review of African-Madagascan gekkonid lizard phylogeny and biogeography (Squamata)". Miscellaneous Publications, Museum of Zoology, University of Michigan (183): 1-20.
Mocquard F (1895). "Sur les reptiles recueillis a Madagascar de 1867 a 1885 par M[onsieur]. Grandidier ". Bulletin de la Société Philomathique de Paris 7: 93–111. (Blæsodactylus boivini, new combination, p. 94). (in French).
Rösler H (2000). "Kommentierte Liste der rezent, subrezent und fossil bekannten Geckotaxa (Reptilia: Gekkonomorpha)". Gekkota 2:  28–153. (Blaesodactylus boivini, p. 61). (in German).

Blaesodactylus
Geckos of Africa
Reptiles of Madagascar
Endemic fauna of Madagascar
Reptiles described in 1856
Taxa named by Auguste Duméril